Valea Rorii River may refer to:

 Valea Rorii, a tributary of the river Balta in Romania
 Rora, a tributary of the Albac in Sibiu County, Romania